The Little Saigon district straddling the cities of Garden Grove and Westminster in Orange County, California is the largest Little Saigon in the United States. Saigon is the former name of the capital of the former South Vietnam, where a large number of first-generation Vietnamese immigrants originate.

History
The oldest, largest, and most prominent Little Saigon is centered in Orange County, California, where over 189,000 Vietnamese Americans reside. With the other five counties (listed below) that make up the bulk of the Southern California mega-region, this region constitutes the largest ethnic Vietnamese population outside of Vietnam.

 2011 US Census Bureau, American Community Survey

The community originally started emerging in Westminster, and quickly spread to the adjacent city of Garden Grove. Today, these two cities rank as the highest concentration of Vietnamese-Americans of any cities in the United States at 37.1% and 31.1%, respectively (according to the 2011 American Community Survey). With its original roots along the bustling Bolsa and Brookhurst corridors, the borders of Orange County's Greater Little Saigon community has grown to nearby cities. The chart below shows the Vietnamese American (VA) population of central Orange County cities that either borders, or is one jurisdiction away from Westminster, CA:

 2011 US Census Bureau, American Community Survey

Since 1978, the nucleus of Little Saigon has long been Bolsa Avenue, where early pioneers Danh Quach and Frank Jao established businesses. During that year, the well-known Nguoi Viet Daily News also began publishing from a home in Garden Grove. 

Other new Vietnamese-American arrivals soon revitalized the area by opening their own businesses in old, formerly white-owned storefronts, and investors constructed large shopping centers containing a mix of businesses. The Vietnamese community and businesses later spread into adjacent Garden Grove, Stanton, Fountain Valley, Anaheim, and Santa Ana.

In 1988, a freeway offramp sign was placed on the Garden Grove Freeway (State Route 22) designating the exits leading to Little Saigon.

Bolsa Avenue in Westminster's eastern neighbor, Santa Ana, has also been designated a Little Saigon, but there are fewer businesses in the area than in either Westminster or Garden Grove. In 2003, some controversies emerged in Santa Ana over a proposed Little Saigon sign to promote its burgeoning Vietnamese commercial area with a design incorporating Vietnamese translation and a South Vietnamese flag. The sign was approved, but redesigned and placed on Euclid Street and First Street (Bolsa Avenue).

Layout and services
In Orange County, Little Saigon is now a wide, spread-out community dotted with a myriad of suburban-style strip malls containing a mixture of Vietnamese and Chinese Vietnamese businesses. It is located southwest of Disneyland between the State Route 22 and Interstate 405. The main focus of Little Saigon is the Bolsa Avenue center (where Asian Garden Mall and Little Saigon Plaza are considered the heart), which runs through Westminster. The street was officially designated Little Saigon by the city council of Westminster in the late 1980s. The borders of Little Saigon can be considered to be Trask and McFadden on the north and south and Euclid and Magnolia on the east and west, respectively. About three-quarters of the population in this area are Vietnamese.

It is lined with numerous huge shopping centers and strip malls. There are approximately 200 restaurants in the area of Little Saigon and spilling over to Garden Grove, Fountain Valley, Santa Ana and Huntington Beach. As with many other Vietnamese American communities, competing mom-and-pop restaurants that serve Vietnamese cuisine, especially phở, are abundant. Restaurants serving Chinese cuisines such as Teochew and Cantonese are also available but in smaller numbers. Little Saigon has seen a surge in coffee shops "Quan Ca-Fe" which are the equivalent to American coffee shops, where Vietnamese men go to spend time with male friends and drink coffee. With such a proliferation in coffee shops, the city of Westminster has limited the number of new coffee shop business licenses. In recent times a few have been shut down due to illegal gambling.

There are quite a number of Vietnamese supermarkets, small Vietnamese delis and bakeries in Little Saigon specializing in French-style coffee and baguette sandwiches - a legacy of Vietnam's colonial past. Adding to growth of Vietnamese markets in the area, the rapidly expanding Vietnamese supermarket superstore chain Shun Fat Supermarket (called in Vietnamese, Siêu thị Thuận Phát) opened its doors in Westminster in 2005. Catering to the large Vietnamese population in the area are also professional offices of doctors, dentists, lawyers, accountants, etc. who speak Vietnamese. Food and authentic Vietnamese cuisine remains the forefront of attractions amongst non-Vietnamese visiting Little Saigon. The community's history of food and cuisine is captured in a recent cookbook by Ann Le, "The Little Saigon Cookbook: Vietnamese Cuisine and Culture in Southern California's Little Saigon."

In 1984, the major Chinese American supermarket chain 99 Ranch Market (initially called 99 Price Market) had its first start in Little Saigon of California. However, unable to compete with many of the Vietnamese markets in the area, the flagship store has since closed and been replaced by another supermarket.

The two-story enclosed Asian Garden Mall was developed by the well-known and influential Little Saigon founder and developer Frank Jao (an ethnic Chinese born in Haiphong, Vietnam) and bankrolled by Chinese Indonesian and Taiwanese investors. Asian Garden Mall was opened in 1987. Owing to its fame, it tends to have the highest costs of rent in Little Saigon. Jao also developed another heavily frequented Vietnamese shopping center across the street, called Asian Village Center, and this center once contained a long court of Confucius statues as motifs, but frequently vacant storefronts in the rear of the plaza were cleared to make way for housing developments. Today, a few of the original statues remain, along with a mural of the Trung Sisters.

Banks
The First Vietnamese American Bank in Westminster is the first to serve co-ethnic clientele (as well as reaching out to Korean and Hispanic clientele) in the United States. Saigon National Bank, located on Brookhurst Street is the first nationally chartered bank organized and owned by Vietnamese Americans in the United States. In addition, in attempting to attract Vietnamese clientele, several Chinese American banks also operate Vietnamese-speaking branches in Little Saigon, including Cathay Bank, East West Bank, and Chinatrust Bank. Major banks—such as Bank of America and Wells Fargo—also have branches with mostly Vietnamese-speaking staff and with Vietnamese signs to attract customers.

Media and entertainment center

Westminster is generally considered the main cultural center of the Vietnamese American community with several Vietnamese-language television stations, radio stations, and newspapers originating from Little Saigon and adjacent areas (for example, Costa Mesa and Santa Ana). For example, there are the newspapers of Nguoi Viet, The Little Saigon News, Việt Báo Daily News, and Vien Dong Daily News. Many Little Saigon newspaper offices are based on Moran Street in Westminster and Vien Dong Daily News also has its own auditorium. 

There are also the broadcasts of Little Saigon TV, SBTN TV (owned by the Vietnamese music and entertainment company Asia, VietFace TV (owned by the Vietnamese music and entertainment company Thuy Nga, also based in Westminster), VNATV, Saigon TV, Little Saigon Radio (Southern California: KVNR AM 1480), and Radio Bolsa (Southern California: KALI-FM 106.3 FM). At least one radio station broadcast 24 hours a day in Vietnamese and 4 television substations broadcasting in Vietnamese 24 hours a day as of 2009.  In addition, many advertisements in Los Angeles area Vietnamese-language programming and publications invariably refer to businesses in Westminster. Many stories about the Vietnamese American community in Orange County are regularly featured in the Orange County Register.

Little Saigon has also emerged as the prominent center of the Vietnamese pop music industry with several recording studios, and with a recording industry many times larger than in Vietnam itself. Vietnamese music recorded in Westminster are distributed and sold in Vietnamese communities throughout the United States and in Australia, France, and Germany as well as illegally in Vietnam. As many as 30 studios once operated in Little Saigon, but the effects of copyright infringement have reduced the number of companies remaining. The US headquarters of the popular Vietnamese music company, Thuy Nga, is located in the heart of Westminster.

Garden Grove Park is the location of an annual Vietnamese Lunar New Year festival held in late January - early February known as Tết. Small amusement park rides, dances, and contests are held in Garden Grove Park which is across the street from Bolsa Grande High School grounds and is hosted by the Union of Vietnamese Student Association (UVSA).

Transportation
In 2016, a free shuttle bus called Little Saigon Shuttle was inaugurated to provide free transportation along the busiest commercial stretch of Westminster, serving 22 stops along the 2.5 mile route.  The service was stopped after 6 months in operation due to the high cost of maintaining it. An intercity bus service named Xe Đò Hoàng connects the Little Saigon in Orange county to the one in San Jose and various other cities in California and Arizona with high concentration of Vietnamese Americans.

Politics

Many in Westminster's Little Saigon are vehemently capitalist and anti-communist. Even with the normalization of U.S.-Vietnam relations in 1995, older Vietnamese are more emotional with a strongly held point of view on the Vietnam War and its aftermath. Five Vietnamese editors were killed from 1981 to 1993 in what authorities  around the country have deemed a series of political attacks.

Anti-Ho Chi Minh protest of 1999

Before the Tết (Vietnamese Lunar New Year) celebrations of 1999, a Vietnamese-American video store owner named Truong Van Tran caused controversy when he displayed in his store a portrait of Vietnamese communist revolutionary leader Ho Chi Minh. This stirred and created anger and passions in the local Vietnamese American community, many of whom were war veterans (of South Vietnamese military), refugees and immigrants from the former South Vietnam - a curious irony since Tran himself was among the refugees who fled the country. Others that participated were some Vietnamese Americans from San Jose. 

Mass vigils with wavings of South Vietnamese flags and demonstrations (sometimes peaceful and sometimes coming close to a riot), in front of the store ensued. For example, an egg was tossed at Tran as he was entering his store. In a coup de grâce, the owner was then arrested by Westminster city police on the charge of illegally renting and copying videos (predominantly Vietnamese entertainment videos, i.e. Thuy Nga's Paris By Night series and Asia Entertainment videos). Since the incident, the video store has disappeared. The event also raised some controversial issues about constitutional free speech in the United States. This incident was also branded as the Hi-Tek Incident, Hi-Tek being the name of the store.

Despite such anti-communist fervor in Little Saigon, however, remittance services (which allow Vietnamese Americans to send money to family members in Vietnam) still remain popular and grocers stock merchandise imported from Vietnam.

Political representation
Vietnamese Americans, due to their large numbers, have exercised considerable political power in Westminster and Garden Grove. Many have won public offices in these two cities. In the 2007 special election to replace the county supervisor serving the district containing Little Saigon, the top two candidates were Vietnamese Americans, garnering almost half the votes in a crowded field of 8 candidates. While comprising 25% of the district's registered voters, Vietnamese Americans accounted for nearly half of all the absentee votes cast. The winner would become the first Vietnamese-American county supervisor in the nation. 

Several Vietnamese Americans serve in the Garden Grove and Westminster city councils. They have pressured the Westminster city council to recognize the former South Vietnamese flag and the Garden Grove city council to controversially designate it a "no-communist zone." In 2003, they helped raise money for a Vietnam Veterans Memorial in Westminster commemorating American and South Vietnamese soldiers. In 2004, Van Tran became the first Vietnamese American to be elected to a state legislature, representing parts of Orange County. Vietnamese Americans attend many city council meetings.

Generational divide
Orange County is the heartland of Republican politics in Southern California. Most Vietnamese Americans in Little Saigon are registered Republicans and it was once anathema to be a Democrat. Hoping to gain the support of Vietnamese American Republicans, Republican presidential candidate (and Vietnam War POW) John McCain once made a campaign stop at the Asian Garden Mall. McCain also drew the ire of some younger Vietnamese Americans when he called his North Vietnamese captors "gooks" (a derogatory term for Asians in general). But other Vietnamese Americans in Orange County, especially U.S.-born, are also Democratic as the younger generations become more concerned with the rights of the blue-collar population in the United States, rather than the old-world politics of Vietnam. However, the registration rates for Republicans still outnumber Democrats, with 55% registered Republicans and only 22% registered Democrats.

Future of the community
The Vietnamese American population has now begun to diffuse from Little Saigon to traditionally working-class Hispanic cities, such as Santa Ana and southward to professional middle-class predominantly white cities such as Huntington Beach and Fountain Valley.

Over the years, the vibrant community of Little Saigon has experienced frequent openings and closures of small mom-and-pop Vietnamese businesses, resulting in sights of some abandoned strip plazas. There is however a resurgence of developments which will begin to shape the future of the area. Recently, a Pho restaurant in the area won the James Beard award, signaling a change in the perception of Vietnamese culture and identity in the region.

References

External links

Ethnic enclaves in California
Little Saigons
Vietnamese-American culture in California
Tourist attractions in Orange County, California
Neighborhoods in Orange County, California
Geography of Garden Grove, California
Westminster, California